The Ambohitsorohitra Palace is a presidential palace in the capital of Madagascar, Antananarivo. It has only a symbolic role and is not a residence of the president.

The palace was built between 1890 and 1892 by the French architect Jully in order to house the office and the residence of the French governor of Madagascar. The palace is built in the French neo-Renaissance style using bricks and stone and was officially inaugurated on 14 July 1892, the National Day of France.

Political events
During a coup between Marc Ravalomanana and Andry Rajoelina on March 16, 2009, the military took over the palace. The military again threatened to do the same during a failed coup in November 2010.

See also 
 Iavoloha Palace
 Rova of Antananarivo.

References 

Presidential residences
Buildings and structures in Antananarivo
Government of Madagascar